{{Infobox residential college
| university      = University of Cambridge
| name            = St Edmund's College
| abbreviation    = ED
| shield          = StEdmund'sCrest.png
| shield_caption  = Arms of St Edmund's College
| blazon          = Arms of Henry Fitzalan-Howard, 15th Duke of Norfolk (quarterly of four: Howard, Brotherton, Warenne, FitzAlan) with a canton of St Edmund of Abingdon (Or, a cross fleury gules between four Cornish choughs proper) all within a bordure argent| image           = 
| alt             = St Edmund's College Chapel and Norfolk East Wing
| caption         = St Edmund's College Chapel
| scarf           = 
| full_name       = The Master, Fellows and Scholars of St Edmund’s College in the University of Cambridge
| latin_name      =Collegium Sancti Edmundi
| latin_motto     = Per Revelationem et Rationem
| english_motto   = 
| founders        = 
| named_after     = Edmund of Abingdon
| established     = 1896
| old_names       = St Edmund's House
| location        = Mount Pleasant, Cambridge (map)
| age_restriction = 21 and older
| head_label      = Master
| head            = Catherine Arnold
| free_label      = Visitor
| free            = Vincent Nichols, Archbishop of Westminster
| undergraduates  = 104
| graduates       = 449
| sister_college  = Green Templeton College, Oxford
| homepage        = 
| mcr_label       = 
| mcr             = 
| endowment       = £18.1m 
| location_map    = United Kingdom Cambridge Central
| location_map2   = United Kingdom Cambridge
}}

St Edmund's College is a constituent college of the University of Cambridge in England. Founded in 1896, it is the second-oldest of the four Cambridge colleges oriented to mature students, which accept only students reading for postgraduate degrees or for undergraduate degrees if aged 21 years or older.

Named after St Edmund of Abingdon (1175–1240), who was the first known Oxford Master of Arts and Archbishop of Canterbury from 1234 to 1240, the college has traditionally Roman Catholic roots. Its founders were Henry Fitzalan-Howard, 15th Duke of Norfolk, and Baron Anatole von Hügel (1854–1928), the first Catholic to take a Cambridge degree since the deposition of King James II in 1688. The Visitor is the Archbishop of Westminster (at present Cardinal Vincent Nichols).

The college is located on Mount Pleasant, northwest of the centre of Cambridge, near Lucy Cavendish College, Murray Edwards College and Fitzwilliam College. Its campus consists of a garden setting on the edge of what was Roman Cambridge, with housing for over 350 students.

Members of St Edmund's include cosmologist and Big Bang theorist Georges Lemaître, Lord St John of Fawsley, Archbishop Eamon Martin, of Armagh, Bishop John Petit of Menevia, and Olympic medalists Simon Schürch (Gold), Thorsten Streppelhoff (Silver), Marc Weber (Silver), Stuart Welch (Silver) and Simon Amor (Silver). St Edmund's was also the residential college of the university's first Catholic students in 200 years – most of whom were studying for the priesthood – after the lifting of the papal prohibition on attendance at the universities of Oxford and Cambridge in 1895 at the urging of a delegation to Pope Leo XIII led by Baron von Hügel.

 History 
Foundation
St Edmund's House was founded in 1896 by Henry Fitzalan-Howard, the 15th Duke of Norfolk, and Baron Anatole von Hügel as an institution providing board and lodging for Roman Catholic students at the University of Cambridge. After Catholic Emancipation, in particular after the Universities Tests Act 1871, students who were Roman Catholics were finally admitted as members of the University. In its early days the college functioned predominantly as a lodging house, or hall of residence, for students who were matriculated at other colleges. Most of the students, at that time, were ordained Catholic priests who were reading various subjects offered by the University. The college was established in the buildings of Ayerst Hostel, which had been set up for non-collegiate students by the Reverend William Ayerst in 1884, and its founding master was Fr Edmund Nolan, then vice-rector of St Edmund's College, Ware. In 1896 Ayerst Hostel had to close due to lack of funds, and the property was transferred to the Catholic Church.

Collegiate Status
Attempts to have St Edmund's House become a constituent college of  the University of Cambridge were undertaken at various junctures, but were met in pre-ecumenical days by continuing opposition from the predominantly Protestant membership of the University’s governing Regent House. Among motives cited were that the college was not self-governing and its assets were held in trust by an external body, namely, the Catholic Church.

The chapel was officially consecrated in 1916 by Cardinal Francis Bourne, Archbishop of Westminster. A new dining hall was constructed in 1939 and the membership of the college increased steadily as it became a recognised House of Residence of the university, without college status.

In response to growing postgraduate student numbers in the early 1960s, the Regent House of the University established several Colleges primarily for postgraduate students, and St Edmund's House became one of the graduate Colleges in the University (the others being Wolfson College, Lucy Cavendish College, Hughes Hall, Clare Hall and Darwin College). This spurred further progress regarding St Edmund's status within the University, and in 1965, the College was permitted to matriculate its own students and new fellows were elected. In 1975 St Edmund's acquired the status of an "Approved Foundation", and after the transfer of the College assets from the Catholic Church to the autonomous governing body comprising the Masters and Fellows of the College in 1986, the College changed its name from "St Edmund's House" to "St Edmund's College". It received university approval for full collegiate status in 1996, and this was confirmed by the grant of its royal charter in 1998. The college now accepts students of all faiths and none.

 Buildings and grounds 

Norfolk Building
The Norfolk Building is the oldest building on site, dating back to 1896 as the former Ayerst Hostel; it provided accommodation for Fr Edmond Nolan, the first Master of St Edmund's, along with the first four students of the college. Known for its clean Gothic revival style, the building underwent a three-phased extension scheme designed by Roderick Gradidge in 1989, and now houses 21st-century amenities including the Middle Combination Room, Dining Hall, Kitchens and a Porter's office.

Chapel
St Edmund's College Chapel is a fitting monument to the Catholic character of the origins of the College and is unique among Colleges of the Universities of Cambridge and Oxford in following the Roman Catholic tradition.

The edifice itself is a Grade II listed building designed by the architect Fr Benedict Williamson CSSP and was consecrated by Cardinal Francis Bourne, Archbishop of Westminster in 1916. Notable for its prayerful simplicity and Gothic Revival architecture, the chapel is a Catholic foundation, although it is open to members of other Christian denominations. In 2003, a stained glass window depicting the ministry of St Boniface of Crediton (c. 675 - 754 AD), the apostle to Germany, was donated by Stephen Frowen and blessed by Cardinal Cormac Murphy-O'Connor, Archbishop of Westminster.

A bronze sculpture of the college patron, St Edmund of Abingdon, is located at the front of the chapel, his left hand holding a Bible. The statue is the work of Rodney Munday, an alumnus of St Edmund Hall, Oxford, and was commissioned by the College in 2007. The Chapel Schola and Choir frequently perform in concerts in collaboration with St Edmund Hall, Oxford and St Edmund's College, Ware in commemoration of their Patron Saint.

Expansion
St Edmund's continues to expand and develop ints buildings. In 2000, a new residential building housing 50 students was opened, named after Richard Laws, one of the former Masters. In 2006, two new residential buildings, including rooms for 70 students as well as apartments for couples, were opened; these were named after the former Master of the College, Sir Brian Heap, and the former Vice-Master, Geoffrey Cook.

In 2016, major plans were announced for the development of two new courts and several buildings which will expand the College and provide modern, world-class facilities for the scholars and students of St Edmunds College. While contemporary, the buildings' external features and material will be in the traditional architectural vernacular that is found elsewhere in the College. Brick buildings will form the perimeter of the two new courts and a new multi-million pound student centre will frame the west side of the College. The expansion plans received planning consent from Cambridge City Council in June 2017.

Okinaga Tower
Created in 1993 by the bequest of the Teikyo Foundation, the Okinaga Tower is the college's tallest structure. Designed by architect Roderick Gradidge in 1989 it houses the Master's Lodge, as well as a suite with views of the city and was opened by the Right Honourable Betty Boothroyd, Speaker of the House of Commons.

Courts and other buildings
Old Court, built in the early 2000s, is located to the west of the Norfolk Building, and surrounded by New Edwardian buildings: Brian Heap Building, Richard Laws Building, Geoffrey Cook Building and the Library Building. It was constructed to accommodate growing student numbers at this time, and most of its constituent buildings are appropriately student dormitories.

New Court, constructed in 2019, consists of student accommodation, Mount Pleasant Halls, occupying the site of a substantial office block formerly on the site and giving St Edmund College a frontage to the main thoroughfare of Huntington Road.

The College Sporting Grounds is located west of the Richard Laws Building, and offers a full-sized soccer pitch for college sports and other outdoor activities.

The College Orchard is south of the Sporting Grounds, and consists of expansive lawns with 5 apple trees, outdoor seating, and a barbecue pit for students.

White Cottage is a humble 18th-century brick farmhouse which pre-dates the college buildings on the site and is now painted white, situated adjacent to Mount Pleasant Halls against which it appears an incongruous survival. White Cottage was the first home of the Von Hugel Institute, a Catholic Institute for Critical Enquiry working in the fields of Christianity and society. The Institute was founded in 1987 to preserve the Roman Catholic legacy of the College when control of the College itself was ceded to its autonomous Governing Body in 1985 in order to achieve university collegiate status.

Bene't House is a detached Edwardian house, south-east of the Norfolk Old Wing. Named after St Benedict of Nursia (c.480 - 547 AD), it has since 2018 contained the facilities and offices for the Von Hugel Institute.

 Gallery 

 Academic profile 
St Edmund's is one of the most international colleges of the university, with students from over 80 countries (2018-2019 academic year). The full spectrum of academic subjects is represented in the college. The fellowship of the college (academic staff) represents many academic disciplines, spread across arts, humanities, social sciences, natural sciences, medicine, and veterinary medicine.

The college has one research institute attached to it: the Von Hügel Institute founded in 1987 to carry out research on Catholic Social Teaching. Describing itself as a 'Catholic Institute for Critical Enquiry' it works in the fields of Christianity and society, and seeks to preserve the Roman Catholic legacy of St Edmund's College when control of the College itself was ceded to its autonomous Governing Body in 1985 in order to achieve university collegiate status. The Von Hügel Institute is therefore a link to the Roman Catholic origins of the college.

The overall examination results of the college's comparatively few undergraduates tend to be in the middle among the Cambridge colleges, with St Edmund's ranking 21st on the Tompkins table in 2018.

Student life
The college is younger than some of the older, more traditional colleges of the university. Despite this St Edmunds maintains many ancient Cambridge traditions including formal hall, albeit with some college modifications. Fellows at most Cambridge and Oxford colleges dine at a "high table" (separately from the students); however, St Edmund's has no such division, allowing undergraduates, postgraduates and Fellows to mix over dinner and other social activities. St Edmund's students are still strictly required to wear their academic gowns during formal halls, ceremonies, and college occasions. The St Edmund's gown is fashioned from distinctive black cloth with close detailing around the neck and sleeves. The robe may only be worn by members of St Edmund's College, Cambridge. The college has a long sporting tradition, including the St Edmund's College Boat Club. In recent years members have competed in varsity teams representing Cambridge University against Oxford University in a wide variety of sports, most notably, at The Boat Race and The Varsity Match.

On 15 September 2017, a team of four rowers from the college broke the World record for the 'Longest Continual Row' in the male 20-29 small team category by over an hour. The following year, on 13 April 2018, a team of ten rowers from the college went on to set the British and World record for "One Million Meters" on the indoor rowing machine in the male 20-29 large team category.

 People associated with the college 

Alumni
Edward Acton, Vice-Chancellor of the University of East Anglia, historian and great-grandson of Lord Acton
Joaquín Almunia, Spanish politician and member of the European Commission responsible for Economic and Monetary Affairs
Simon Amor, Current Head Coach of the England Sevens, member of the England Sevens at the 2002 Manchester Games
Malcolm Baker, Professor of finance, and a former Olympic rower
Johan Bäverbrant, Swedish diplomat
Aidan Bellenger, English historian and former Benedictine monk
Alexander Bird, British philosopher and Bertrand Russell Professor of Philosophy at the University of Cambridge
William T. Cavanaugh, director of the Center for World Catholicism and Intercultural Theology, and professor of Catholic studies at DePaul University
James Chau, Journalist, television presenter, and United Nations goodwill ambassador
Christian Cormack, British rowing cox
Captain Sir George Sampson Elliston, Conservative Member of Parliament (MP) for Blackburn from 1931 to 1945
Chito Gascon, Chair of the Human Rights Commission of the Philippines
Alex Hughes, Archdeacon of Cambridge
Hilary Lofting, Australian novelist, travel writer, journalist and editor. Eldest brother of Hugh Lofting (author of The Story of Doctor Dolittle).
Louise Lombard, English actress
Greg Loveridge, Former cricketer who played one Test for New Zealand in 1996
Eamon Martin, Archbishop of Armagh and Primate of All Ireland
Rodrigo Rosenberg Marzano, Guatemalan attorney and human rights activist
Alexander Masters, author, screenwriter, and worker with the homeless. Masters was portrayed by Benedict Cumberbatch in Stuart: A Life Backwards''.
Anna Mendelssohn, British writer, poet, and political activist
Robert Noel, Officer of Arms (Herald) at the College of Arms
Chris Oti, English former rugby union player
Richard Phelps (rower), rower who competed in the 1992 Summer Olympics
Norman St John-Stevas, Baron St John of Fawsley, legal scholar, former master of Emmanuel College, and Leader of the House of Commons under Margaret Thatcher was a resident at St Edmund's House for his undergraduate studies in late 1940s and early 1950s. During his time he was the president of the Union Society
Christopher Stearn, English former first-class cricketer
Thorsten Streppelhoff, Olympic Silver Medalist and German M8+ Rower at the 1996 Atlanta and 1992 Barcelona Games
David R. Syiemlieh, Indian academician and the former Chairman of the Union Public Service Commission of India
David Wallace, British scholar of medieval literature and Judith Rodin Professor of English, who teaches at the University of Pennsylvania
Patrick Walsh, Irish prelate of the Roman Catholic Church and from 1991 until 2008 he was the 31st bishop of Down & Connor
Luke Walton, American Olympic rower
Marc Weber, Olympic Silver Medalist and German M8+ Rower at the 1996 Atlanta Games
Stuart Welch, Olympic Silver Medalist and Australian M8+ Rower at the 2000 Sydney Games

Fellows
Denis Alexander, Emeritus Fellow of St. Edmund’s College, Cambridge and an Emeritus Director of the Faraday Institute for Science and Religion, Cambridge
Allen Brent, scholar of early Christian history and literature
Sir Martin Evans , Laureate of the 2007 Nobel Prize in Physiology or Medicine
Andy Harter, British computer scientist
Sir Brian Heap CBE FRS is a biologist who was the master of the college from 1996 until 2004. He was elected a fellow of the Royal Society in 1989 and held the post vice-president and foreign secretary from 1996 to 2001
Richard Edwin Hills, emeritus professor of Radio Astronomy at the University of Cambridge
Kevin T. Kelly, British Roman Catholic priest and moral theologian
Edward Kessler, Founder President of The Woolf Institute and a leading thinker in interfaith relations, primarily Jewish-Christian-Muslim Relations
Ilyas Khan, British technologist and businessman
Nicholas Lash, English Roman Catholic theologian
Georges Lemaître, cosmologist and Big Bang theorist, was a visiting academic at the college in 1923–24, while collaborating with Sir Arthur Eddington
Helen Mason, theoretical physicist
Josef W. Meri, American historian of Interfaith Relations in the Middle East in the College of Islamic Studies, Hamad Bin Khalifa University
Simon Mitton, astronomer and author. Elected member of the Council of the Royal Astronomical Society.
Mark Ranby, former New Zealand rugby union player
Chris Rapley, British scientist
Somak Raychaudhury, Indian astrophysicist
C. J. Ryan, Scottish priest and scholar of Italian studies
Brian Stanley, British historian
Bob White, Professor of Geophysics in the Earth Sciences department at Cambridge University (since 1989) and was elected a Fellow of the Royal Society (FRS) in 1994

Honorary Fellows
 Bruce Alberts, American biochemist and the Chancellor’s Leadership Chair in Biochemistry and Biophysics for Science and Education at the University of California, San Francisco
 Anne, Princess Royal, second child and only daughter of Queen Elizabeth II and Prince Philip, Duke of Edinburgh
 Betty Boothroyd, British politician who served as the Member of Parliament (MP) for West Bromwich and West Bromwich West from 1973 to 2000
 Alec Broers, Baron Broers, British electrical engineer
 Colin Bundy, South African historian, former principal of Green Templeton College, Oxford and former director of SOAS University of London
 Derek Burke, British academic who served as Vice-Chancellor of the University of East Anglia
 Francis Campbell, former UK Ambassador to the Holy See
 Janet Neel Cohen, Baroness Cohen of Pimlico, British lawyer and crime fiction writer
 Edward Fitzalan-Howard, 18th Duke of Norfolk, British peer who holds the hereditary office of Earl Marshal
 Alan Hopes, British Roman Catholic prelate
 Denise Lievesley, formerly Chief Executive of the English Information Centre for Health and Social Care, Director of Statistics at UNESCO
 Mary McAleese, former President of Ireland and patron of the Von Hugel Institute
 Bridget Ogilvie, Australian and British scientist
 Prince Philip, Duke of Edinburgh, husband of Queen Elizabeth II
 Sir Tom Phillips, diplomat who served as Commandant of the Royal College of Defence Studies from 2014 to 2018
 Anthony Russell, Anglican bishop
 Amartya Sen, laureate of the 1998 Nobel Prize in Economics
 Peter Smith, Metropolitan Archbishop of Southwark (London)
 Crispin Tickell, British diplomat, environmentalist, and academic

List of Masters of St Edmund's College
St Edmund's House
 1897–1904: William Ormond Sutcliffe
 1904–1909: Edmund Nolan
 1909–1918: Thomas Leighton Williams
 1918–1921: Joseph Louis Whitfield
 1921–1929: John Francis McNulty
 1929–1934: Cuthbert Leonard Waring
 1934–1946: John Edward Petit
 1946–1964: Raymond Corboy
 1964–1976: Garrett Daniel Sweeney
 1976–1985: John Coventry
 1985–1996: Richard Laws
St Edmund's College
 1996–2004: Brian Heap
 2004–2014: Paul Luzio
 2014–2019: Matthew Bullock
 2019–present: Catherine Arnold

References

Further reading

External links

College website

 
Colleges of the University of Cambridge
1896 establishments in England
Educational institutions established in 1896
Grade II listed buildings in Cambridge
Grade II listed educational buildings
Catholic Church in Cambridge
Catholic universities and colleges in England